Crime in Egypt is moderate, but still occurs in various forms. Forms of crime include drug trafficking, money laundering, fraud, corruption, black marketeering etc.

Current crimes
White-collar crime, smuggling, black marketeering, and other economic crimes like embezzlement, tax evasion, kickbacks and bribery increased when Anwar El Sadat and Hosni Mubarak were the President of Egypt. In 2015, reports of sexual harassment highly increased in tourist attractions in Egypt, including at the Pyramids of Giza. Threats of terrorism also occur as the United States has assessed Cairo to be critical location for terrorist activity.

Crime by type

Petty crime
During the 1980s, petty crime was a significant problem in Egypt, but has been declining since then.Incidence of Crime ''Federal Research Division]. Motor vehicle theft, crime by women and juveniles and incidents of kidnappings were increased in Cairo in 1988. In an interview in 1989, the director of security for Cairo described poor economic conditions, high unemployment, population growth, and changes in social norms as the reasons behind higher crime rates. Bank robberies, gang violence, and other violent crime were less common.

Corruption

Sadat established commissions for the investigation of corruption among government officials. Mubarak replaced many cabinet members for inability in detecting corruption. Despite such measures, economic crimes continued to be widespread.

Law enforcement have been reported to be dangerously corrupt, making affiliations with tuktuk and taxi drivers break traffic laws for a charge. Also, making false warrants and unlawful arrests on suspects who are filed with cases made by paying rivals.

Sexual violence 

Rape is one of the most common crimes in Egypt. The Egyptian Centre for Women's Rights (ECWR) has called the problem "social cancer" and suggested that dress code is no deterrent at all. ECWR carried out a survey in 2008 which found that 83 percent of Egyptian women and 98 percent of foreign women within Egypt had experienced sexual harassment at some time, and only 12% had gone to the police for complaining such issue.

Mass rapes have been carried out during festivals and the Egyptian protests, and include the public rapes of women, and female journalists.

Drug trafficking
Egypt is a party to the 1961, 1971, and 1988 international drug control conventions. Its
national drug control laws are generally assessed as adequate. However, Drug trafficking is still a persistent problem in Egypt. Egypt is a country for cannabis, heroin and opium destined for Europe, Israel, and North Africa. According to a 2003 research undertaken by the Egyptian government, the narcotics problem costs the Egyptian economy roughly $800 million per year, including amounts spent on illegal drugs and government expenditures to tackle the problem.

Human trafficking 
 
Egypt serves as a transit country for women trafficked from Eastern Europe to Israel for commercial sexual exploitation. Men and women from countries in sub-Saharan Africa and Asia are believed to be trafficked through the Sinai Desert to Israel and Europe for labor. Many Egyptian children from rural areas are trafficked to other areas in Egypt as domestic servants or laborers in the agriculture industry.

Terrorism and Religious Violence

Egypt suffers from religious violence and terrorism, infrequent attacks both on tourists and religious minorities. Notable examples include the
Luxor massacre (1997), the 2004 Sinai bombings, 2005 attacks  in Cairo and in Sharm el-Sheikh, the 2006 Dahab bombings and the 2011 Alexandria bombing.

References